Gondo Widjojo (21 June 1946 – date of death 21 August 1992) was a tennis player from Indonesia.

Biography
Widjojo competed in the men's singles, doubles and mixed doubles draws at the 1968 Australian Championships. All of his other Grand Slam appearances were in the men's doubles, at the 1970 Australian Open, 1971 French Open and 1971 US Open. He won a Grand Prix doubles title in 1971, when he teamed up with countryman Atet Wijono at a clay court tournament in Senigallia, Italy. They defeated the home pairing of Ezio Di Matteo and Antonio Zugarelli. His best singles performance was a quarter-final appearance at the Jakarta Open in 1973.

A regular Davis Cup representative for Indonesia, Widjojo played in a total of 20 ties for his national team. His representative career included a win over Australian player Colin Dibley in 1971 and a rare Davis Cup triple bagel when he beat Hong Kong's Po Tao in 1973. By the time he made his last appearance in 1981 he had played 37 matches, for 12 wins. He was posthumously awarded a Davis Cup Commitment Award in 2015.

Grand Prix career finals

Doubles: 1 (1–0)

References

External links
 
 
 

1945 births
Tennis players at the 1978 Asian Games
Asian Games gold medalists for Indonesia
Medalists at the 1978 Asian Games
Indonesian male tennis players
Southeast Asian Games gold medalists for Indonesia
Southeast Asian Games medalists in tennis
Asian Games medalists in tennis
Year of death missing
Competitors at the 1977 Southeast Asian Games